Spring Lake is a borough situated on the Jersey Shore in Monmouth County, in the U.S. state of New Jersey. As of the 2020 United States census, the borough's population was 2,789, a decrease of 204 (−6.8%) from the 2,993 enumerated at the 2010 census, which in turn had reflected a decline of 574 (−16.1%) from the 3,567 counted at the 2000 census.

New Jersey Monthly magazine ranked Spring Lake as the 240th best place to live in New Jersey in its 2010 rankings of the "Best Places To Live" in New Jersey.

History

Spring Lake was formed as a borough by an act of the New Jersey Legislature on March 14, 1892, from portions of Wall Township, based on the results of a referendum held on March 8, 1892. On February 24, 1903, the borough of North Spring Lake was annexed to Spring Lake. The borough was named for a clear spring-fed lake.

During the "Gilded Age" of the late 19th and early 20th centuries, Spring Lake developed into a coastal resort for members of New York City and Philadelphia high society, in similar fashion to the settlements of Newport, Rhode Island and Bar Harbor, Maine.  A surviving example of architecture constructed during this era is the Martin Maloney Cottage on Morris Avenue next to the tycoon's former and no longer existent Ballingarry Estate. Another fine example of period architecture listed on the National Register of Historic Places is the Audenried Cottage on Tuttle Avenue.

The owner of the Ballingarry Estate, Marquis Martin Maloney, built St. Catharine Roman Catholic Church on a knoll overlooking the eponymous Spring Lake. The cornerstone of the church was laid on St. Patrick's Day in 1901.

The wave of attacks took place between July 1 and July 12, 1916, along  of Atlantic Ocean coastline and is often attributed as having inspired the novel Jaws by Peter Benchley and the corresponding film by Steven Spielberg, though Benchley has explicitly denied the claim.

The borough and its environs are known as the "Irish Riviera" because of the large Irish-American population in the area, with Spring Lake having the highest percentage of any municipality in the United States.

The Spring Lake 5 Mile Run, a race that was first run in 1977, circles the borough, beginning and ending at the beachfront. The 2014 race had 10,360 finishers, out of 12,500 registered; it is the country's largest 5-mile race. In 2015, the race was listed as one of the top 100 races in America by Runner's World magazine.

Geography

According to the United States Census Bureau, the borough had a total area of 1.75 square miles (4.52 km2), including 1.33 square miles (3.45 km2) of land and 0.41 square miles (1.07 km2) of water (23.60%).

The borough borders the Monmouth County municipalities of Belmar, Lake Como, Sea Girt, Spring Lake Heights and Wall Township.

North Spring Lake was an independent borough established in 1884 which comprised the northern portion of Spring Lake. The borough was disestablished and its territory was annexed by Spring Lake in 1903.

Demographics

Census 2010

The Census Bureau's 2006–2010 American Community Survey showed that (in 2010 inflation-adjusted dollars) median household income was $97,885 (with a margin of error of +/− $16,792) and the median family income was $150,156 (+/− $39,466). Males had a median income of $106,853 (+/− $30,491) versus $68,750 (+/− $15,695) for females. The per capita income for the borough was $71,661 (+/− $14,582). About 2.2% of families and 2.8% of the population were below the poverty line, including none of those under age 18 and 2.0% of those age 65 or over.

Census 2000

As of the 2000 United States Census there were 3,567 people, 1,463 households, and 983 families residing in the borough. The population density was 2,723.8 people per square mile (1,051.3/km2). There were 1,930 housing units at an average density of 1,473.7 per square mile (568.8/km2). The racial makeup of the borough was 98.77% White, 0.34% African American, 0.28% Asian, 0.11% from other races, and 0.50% from two or more races. Hispanic or Latino of any race were 0.73% of the population.

There were 1,463 households, out of which 23.0% had children under the age of 18 living with them, 57.8% were married couples living together, 7.2% had a female householder with no husband present, and 32.8% were non-families. 29.5% of all households were made up of individuals, and 16.4% had someone living alone who was 65 years of age or older. The average household size was 2.43 and the average family size was 3.03.

In the borough the population was spread out, with 21.8% under the age of 18, 4.5% from 18 to 24, 19.6% from 25 to 44, 28.9% from 45 to 64, and 25.1% who were 65 years of age or older. The median age was 48 years. For every 100 females, there were 86.1 males. For every 100 females age 18 and over, there were 83.2 males.

As of 2008, the median income for a household in the borough was $115,709.  Males had a median income of $88,924 versus $41,000 for females. The per capita income for the borough was $59,445. None of the families and 2.6% of the population were living below the poverty line, including no under eighteens and 6.6% of those over 64.

39.4% of Spring Lake residents identified as being of Irish American ancestry in the 2000 Census, the highest percentage of Irish Americans of any place in the United States.

Government

Local government
Spring Lake is governed under the Borough form of New Jersey municipal government, which is used in 218 municipalities (of the 564) statewide, making it the most common form of government in New Jersey. The governing body is comprised of the Mayor and the Borough Council, with all positions elected at-large on a partisan basis as part of the November general election. The Mayor is elected directly by the voters to a four-year term of office. The Borough Council is comprised of six members elected to serve three-year terms on a staggered basis, with two seats coming up for election each year in a three-year cycle. The Borough form of government used by Spring Lake is a "weak mayor / strong council" government in which council members act as the legislative body with the mayor presiding at meetings and voting only in the event of a tie. The mayor can veto ordinances subject to an override by a two-thirds majority vote of the council. The mayor makes committee and liaison assignments for council members, and most appointments are made by the mayor with the advice and consent of the council.

, the Mayor of Spring Lake is Democrat Jennifer Naughton, whose term of office ends on December 31, 2023. Members of the Spring Lake Borough Council are Council President Joseph T. Erbe Jr. (R, 2022), David R. Frost (R, 2022), Brendan Judge (R, 2023), Kathleen McDonough (R, 2024), Matthew Q. Sagui (R, 2023) and Syd Whalley (D, 2024).

Federal, state and county representation
Spring Lake is located in the 4th Congressional District and is part of New Jersey's 30th legislative district. Prior to the 2011 reapportionment following the 2010 Census, Spring Lake had been in the 11th state legislative district.

 

Monmouth County is governed by its Board of County Commissioners, which comprises five members who are elected at-large to serve three year terms of office on a staggered basis, with either one or two seats up for election each year as part of the November general election. At an annual reorganization meeting held in the beginning of January, the board selects one of its members to serve as Director and another as Deputy Director. , Monmouth County's Commissioners are
Commissioner Director Thomas A. Arnone (R, Neptune City, term as commissioner and as director ends December 31, 2022), 
Commissioner Deputy Director Susan M. Kiley (R, Hazlet Township, term as commissioner ends December 31, 2024; term as deputy commissioner director ends 2022),
Lillian G. Burry (R, Colts Neck Township, 2023),
Nick DiRocco (R, Wall Township, 2022), and 
Ross F. Licitra (R, Marlboro Township, 2023). 
Constitutional officers elected on a countywide basis are
County clerk Christine Giordano Hanlon (R, 2025; Ocean Township), 
Sheriff Shaun Golden (R, 2022; Howell Township) and 
Surrogate Rosemarie D. Peters (R, 2026; Middletown Township).

Politics

As of March 23, 2011, there were a total of 2,520 registered voters in Spring Lake, of which 453 (18.0%) were registered as Democrats, 1,104 (43.8%) were registered as Republicans and 961 (38.1%) were registered as Unaffiliated. There were two voters registered as Libertarians or Greens.

In the 2012 presidential election, Republican Mitt Romney received 70.4% of the vote (1,258 cast), ahead of Democrat Barack Obama with 28.7% (514 votes), and other candidates with 0.9% (16 votes), among the 1,804 ballots cast by the borough's 2,544 registered voters (16 ballots were spoiled), for a turnout of 70.9%. In the 2008 presidential election, Republican John McCain received 64.4% of the vote (1,326 cast), ahead of Democrat Barack Obama with 32.8% (676 votes) and other candidates with 1.0% (20 votes), among the 2,059 ballots cast by the borough's 2,692 registered voters, for a turnout of 76.5%. In the 2004 presidential election, Republican George W. Bush received 64.0% of the vote (1,427 ballots cast), outpolling Democrat John Kerry with 30.1% (670 votes) and other candidates with 1.0% (30 votes), among the 2,229 ballots cast by the borough's 2,873 registered voters, for a turnout percentage of 77.6.

In the 2013 gubernatorial election, Republican Chris Christie received 82.7% of the vote (1,226 cast), ahead of Democrat Barbara Buono with 15.5% (230 votes), and other candidates with 1.8% (26 votes), among the 1,505 ballots cast by the borough's 2,542 registered voters (23 ballots were spoiled), for a turnout of 59.2%. In the 2009 gubernatorial election, Republican Chris Christie received 68.8% of the vote (1,144 ballots cast), ahead of  Democrat Jon Corzine with 23.3% (388 votes), Independent Chris Daggett with 5.7% (95 votes) and other candidates with 0.7% (11 votes), among the 1,663 ballots cast by the borough's 2,593 registered voters, yielding a 64.1% turnout.

Education

The Spring Lake School District is a public school district that serves students in pre-kindergarten through eighth grade at H. W. Mountz School. As of the 2018–2019 school year, the district, comprised of one school, had an enrollment of 181 students and 27.0 classroom teachers (on an FTE basis), for a student–teacher ratio of 6.7:1. In the 2016–2017 school year, Spring Lake had the 43rd smallest enrollment of any school district in the state, with 197 students. In 2015, H.W. Mountz School was one of 15 schools in New Jersey, and one of nine public schools, recognized as a National Blue Ribbon School in the exemplary high performing category by the United States Department of Education.

Students attending public high school for ninth through twelfth grades are assigned to Manasquan High School as part of a sending/receiving relationship with the Manasquan Public Schools. Manasquan High School also serves students from Avon-by-the-Sea, Belmar, Brielle, Lake Como, Sea Girt and Spring Lake Heights who attend Manasquan High School as part of sending/receiving relationships with their respective districts. As of the 2018–2019 school year, the high school had an enrollment of 969 students and 72.9 classroom teachers (on an FTE basis), for a student–teacher ratio of 13.3:1.

Students may also attend one of the magnet schools in the Monmouth County Vocational School District—Marine Academy of Science and Technology, Academy of Allied Health & Science, High Technology High School, Biotechnology High School, and Communications High School.

Spring Lake students are also served by Saint Catharine School, a Catholic school that serves students in grades K–8 and operates under the supervision of the Roman Catholic Diocese of Trenton. In 2018, the school was one of 18 schools in New Jersey recognized by the National Blue Ribbon Schools Program.

Transportation

Roads and highways

No major roads pass through the borough, with the most significant routes being minor county roads such as County Route 18. Route 71 is accessible in bordering Spring Lake Heights. The Garden State Parkway and Interstate 195 are accessible in neighboring Wall Township.

Public transportation
NJ Transit offers train service at the Spring Lake station on the North Jersey Coast Line via Newark Penn Station to Secaucus Junction, Penn Station New York and Hoboken Terminal.

NJ Transit bus service is available between the borough and Philadelphia on the 317 route, with local service offered on the 830 route.

Climate

According to the Köppen climate classification system, Spring Lake, New Jersey has a humid subtropical climate (Cfa). Cfa climates are characterized by all months having an average mean temperature > 32.0 °F (> 0.0 °C), at least four months with an average mean temperature ≥ 50.0 °F (≥ 10.0 °C), at least one month with an average mean temperature ≥ 71.6 °F (≥ 22.0 °C) and no significant precipitation difference between seasons. During the summer months at Spring Lake, a cooling afternoon  sea breeze is present on most days, but episodes of extreme heat and humidity can occur with heat index values ≥ 95 °F (≥ 35 °C). On average, the wettest month of the year is July which corresponds with the annual peak in thunderstorm activity. During the winter months, episodes of extreme cold and wind can occur with wind chill values < 0 °F (< −18 °C). The plant hardiness zone at Spring Lake Beach is 7a with an average annual extreme minimum air temperature of 3.8 °F (−15.7 °C).

Ecology

According to the A. W. Kuchler U.S. potential natural vegetation types, Spring Lake, New Jersey would have an Appalachian Oak (104) vegetation type with an Eastern Hardwood Forest (25) vegetation form.

Notable people

People who were born in, residents of, or otherwise closely associated with Spring Lake include:

 Charles A. Agemian (1909–1996), banker who left Chase Manhattan Bank and became chairman and chief executive officer of Garden State National Bank
 George Ansbro (1915–2011), radio announcer for six decades on NBC and CBS
 Craig Biggio (born 1965), Houston Astros MLB hall of fame baseball player
 Tom Brower (born 1965), member of the Hawaii House of Representatives
 Chris Candido (1972–2005), professional wrestler
 Bill Carmody (born 1951), head basketball coach at Northwestern University
 Caroline Casagrande (born 1976), politician who represented the 12th and 11th Districts in the New Jersey General Assembly from 2008 to 2015
 Robert Chesebrough (1837–1933), inventor of Vaseline
 Katharine "Kerry" Close (born 1992), winner of the 79th annual Scripps National Spelling Bee in 2006
 John F. Crosby (1889–1962), lawyer who served as the United States Attorney for the District of Connecticut
 Paul J. Curran (1933–2008), politician who served in the New York State Assembly and fought corruption as a federal prosecutor and as the state's commissioner of investigation
 Al DeRogatis (1927–1995), NY Giants football player and NBC television sportscaster
 Khigh Dhiegh (1910–1991), actor, starred in the original film version of The Manchurian Candidate
 Anne Evans Estabrook, real estate developer who was the frontrunner in the Republican primary for the 2008 United States Senate race in New Jersey before suffering a mini-stroke and withdrawing from the race
 Jack Ford, Court TV news anchor
 Mary Higgins Clark (1927–2020), writer whose 2001 book On the Street Where You Live was set in Spring Lake
 Kermit Love (1916–2008), creator of the Sesame Street characters Big Bird and Mr. Snuffleupagus
 Jim Manzi (born 1963), technology entrepreneur
 William Gibbs McAdoo (1863–1941), United States Secretary of the Treasury under President Wilson
 George T. McDonald (1944–2021), philanthropist and social worker who founded the homeless advocacy group The Doe Fund
 Gil McDougald (1928–2010), former New York Yankees infielder
 James P. Mitchell (1900–1964), United States Secretary of Labor from 1953 to 1961 during the Eisenhower Administration
 Vincent J. Murphy (1893–1976), Mayor of Newark, New Jersey from 1941 to 1949
 Jack Nicholson (born 1937), actor
 Wilbur Ross (born 1937), investor and former banker
 Sonny Senerchia (1931–2003), former Major League Baseball third baseman who played for the Pittsburgh Pirates in 1952
 John Wiggers (1917–2007), professional basketball player who played for the Akron Goodyear Wingfoots in the National Basketball League
 Charles D. Wrege (1924–2014), management historian and professor at Rutgers University

Popular culture
Spring Lake is the setting for the Mary Higgins Clark novel On the Street Where You Live. The opening scenes of Ulu Grosbard's 1968 film The Subject Was Roses were filmed in Spring Lake. Indie rock band Vampire Weekend filmed a music video for their song "Cape Cod Kwassa Kwassa" in a home in Spring Lake, as well as on the beach. Spring Lake was used as a stand-in for turn-of-the-century Atlantic City, New Jersey, in the 1981 film Ragtime.

In John Frankenheimer's 1962 film The Manchurian Candidate, the character of Major Bennett Marco (played by Frank Sinatra) suffers from a nightmare set in Spring Lake. He imagines himself and his fellow soldiers sitting through a lecture by Mrs. Henry Whitaker of the Spring Lake Garden Club. A sign reveals the location of the lecture to be the fictional "Spring Lake Hotel". Eventually, the audience sees that the garden club meeting is merely an illusion and the platoon is actually at a meeting of Russian and Chinese officials in Manchuria. The Mrs. Whitaker character is actually a Chinese scientist named Dr. Yen Lo, portrayed by Spring Lake native Khigh Dhiegh.

References

External links

Borough of Spring Lake official website
Spring Lake community website
Spring Lake Chamber of Commerce
H. W. Mountz School

School Data for the H. W. Mountz School, National Center for Education Statistics
A clip of Spring Lake circa 1929, from the Spring Lake Historical Society
Images of America: Spring Lake, by area historian Patricia F. Colrick
The New York Times, Weekender: Spring Lake, NJ

 
1892 establishments in New Jersey
Borough form of New Jersey government
Boroughs in Monmouth County, New Jersey
Irish-American neighborhoods
Jersey Shore communities in Monmouth County
Populated places established in 1892